Mount Cupola is a dome-shaped mountain,  high, marking the southeastern limit of the Rouen Mountains in the northern part of Alexander Island. It was first photographed from the air by the British Graham Land Expedition in 1937, and surveyed in 1948 by the Falkland Islands Dependencies Survey. The descriptive name was given by the UK Antarctic Place-Names Committee in 1960. Mount Cupola is the fifth-highest point of Alexander Island, succeeded by Mount Huckle in the Douglas Range.

See also
 Mount Calais
 Mount Paris
 Mount Spivey

Further reading 
 Damien Gildea, Antarctic Peninsula - Mountaineering in Antarctica: Travel Guide
 Defense Mapping Agency  1992, Sailing Directions (planning Guide) and (enroute) for Antarctica, P 377

References
 

Mountains of Alexander Island